Tapotement is a specific technique used in Swedish massage.   It is a rhythmic percussion, most frequently administered with the edge of the hand, a cupped hand or the tips of the fingers. There are five types of tapotement including Beating (closed fist lightly hitting area), Slapping (use of fingers to gently slap), Hacking (use the edge of hand on pinky finger side), Tapping (use just fingertips) and Cupping (make your hand look like a cup and gently tap area). It is primarily used to "wake up" the nervous system and also as a stimulating stroke which can release lymphatic build up in the back.

The name of the stroke is taken from the French word "Tapoter", meaning to tap or to drum.

See also 
 Swedish massage
 Effleurage
 Petrissage
 Gua sha

References

External links 
 Glossary of Massage Terms - American Massage Therapy Association
 What is Tapotement?

Manual therapy
Massage